Vardan Voskanyan (born 1 January 1972 in Yerevan, Armenian SSR) is an Armenian judoka. He competed at the 2000 Summer Olympics.

Achievements

References

External links
 
Sports-Reference.com

1972 births
Living people
Sportspeople from Yerevan
Armenian male judoka
Olympic judoka of Armenia
Judoka at the 2000 Summer Olympics